Box is the first box set by indie rock band Guided by Voices. The set was released in 1995 on CD and vinyl. It collects their first four limited-release albums Devil Between My Toes, Sandbox, Self Inflicted Aerial Nostalgia and Same Place the Fly Got Smashed, as well as an LP of previously unavailable material, King Shit and the Golden Boys.

The vinyl edition also includes Propeller – this was excluded from the CD version as the album was already available on that format, having been included on the first CD edition of Vampire on Titus.

Track list

Devil Between My Toes (Disc 1) 
 Old Battery
 Discussing Wallace Chambers
 Cyclops
 Crux
 A Portrait Destroyed By Fire
 3 Year Old Man
 Dog's Out
 A Proud And Booming Industry
 Hank's Little Fingers
 Artboat
 Hey Hey, Spaceman
 The Tumblers
 Bread Alone
 Captain's Dead

Sandbox (Disc 2) 
 Lips Of Steel
 A Visit To The Creep Doctor
 Everyday
 Barricade
 Get To Know The Ropes
 Can't Stop
 The Drinking Jim Crow
 Trap Soul Door
 Common Rebels
 Long Distance Man
 I Certainly Hope Not
 Adverse Wind

Self-Inflicted Aerial Nostalgia (Disc 3) 
 The Future Is In Eggs
 The Great Blake Street Canoe Race
 Slopes Of Big Ugly
 Paper Girl
 Navigating Flood Regions
 An Earful O' Wax
 White Whale
 Trampoline
 Short On Posters
 Chief Barrel Belly
 Dying To Try This
 The Qualifying Remainder
 Liar's Tale
 Radio Show (Trust The Wizard)

Same Place The Fly Got Smashed (Disc 4) 
 Airshow '88
 Order For The New Slave Trade
 The Hard Way
 Drinker's Peace
 Mammoth Cave
 When She Turns 50
 Club Molluska
 Pendulum
 Ambergris
 Local Mix-Up
 Murder Charge
 Starboy
 Blatant Doom Trip
 How Loft I Am?

Propeller (Disc 5)-Vinyl Only 
 Over The Neptune / Mesh Gear Fox
 Weed King
 Particular Damaged
 Quality Of Armor
 Metal Mothers
 Lethargy
 Unleashed! The Large-Hearted Boy
 Red Gas Circle
 Exit Flagger
 14 Cheerleader Coldfront
 Back To Saturn X Radio Report
 Ergo Space Pig
 Circus World
 Some Drilling Implied
 On The Tundra

King Shit And The Golden Boys (Disc 6) 
 We've Got Airplanes
 Dust Devil
 Squirmish Frontal Room
 Tricyclic Looper
 Crutch Came Slinking
 Fantasy Creeps
 Sopor Joe
 Crunch Pillow
 Indian Was An Angel
 Don't Stop Now
 Bite
 Greenface
 Deathtrot And Warlock Riding A Rooster
 2nd Moves To Twin
 At Odds With Dr. Genesis
 Please Freeze Me
 Scissors
 Postal Blowfish
 Crocker's Favorite Song

References 

Guided by Voices compilation albums
1995 compilation albums